Our Republican Party (ORP) is a conservative and pro-Park Geun-hye party in South Korea. Originally founded as the Liberty Republican Party (Korean: 자유공화당), it has reverted to its original name shortly after Kim Moon-soo withdrew from the party.

Election results

President

Legislature

References

See also
Impeachment of Park Geun-hye

2020 establishments in South Korea
Anti-communism in South Korea
Anti-communist parties
Christian political parties
Conservative parties in South Korea
Far-right politics in South Korea
Ilminist parties
Political parties established in 2020
Political parties in South Korea
Right-wing populism in South Korea
Right-wing populist parties
Social conservative parties